Zhang Yi (born 16 May 1980) is a former Chinese badminton player. In 1997, he reached the final at the Asian Junior Championships in the boys' doubles event partnered with Cai Yun, beating their compatriots Xia Xuanze and Chen Hong in the semifinals with the straight games, but they lost to Malaysian paired in the final. In 2005, he compete in the men's singles main draw at the All England Open after won three match in the qualification round. Born in Guangdong, Zhang had won the mixed doubles titles at the 2007 Hungarian International,  2008 Austrian and Portugal International, also at the 2009 Estonian International.

Zhang had been a player and coach of the Täby badminton club in Sweden since 2004. He also one of the initiators of the Swedish Chinese Association in badminton. As a Täby player, he clinched the 2006 Swedish National Championships in the men's doubles event partnered with Joakim Andersson.

Achievements

Asian Junior Championships 
Boys' doubles

BWF International Challenge/Series 
Men's doubles

Mixed doubles

References

External links
 

1980 births
Living people
Badminton players from Guangdong
Chinese male badminton players